Thomas Fellows is an American author of non-fiction self-help books.

Early life and education 
He attended The Westminster Schools as well as Samford University, in Birmingham, Alabama.

Career 
Fellows works in technology hardware sales.

He has written four books that seek to interweave biblical scripture, history, and literature: He Spoke with Authority: Get, the Give the Advantage of Confidence,The Criminal: The Power of an Apology, and Mrs. Dubose's Last Wish: The Art of Embracing Suffering. His books also feature popular movies and music. Fellows credits his bipolar diagnosis for his creativity in his writing.

Writing
Fellows started his first book, Forget Self-Help: Re-Examining the Golden Rule, at age twenty while he was a counselor at a summer camp in Mentone, Alabama. Based upon the Golden Rule found in Matthew 7:12, the book examines the actions of characters in To Kill a Mockingbird and Uncle Tom's Cabin as well as the writings of Robert E. Lee and Martin Luther King Jr. Fellows not only encourages the reader to follow the Golden Rule, but says that the Golden  Rule is lost in modern-day Christianity. It also gives tips for overcoming clinical depression which Fellows has struggled with since he graduated high school.

While the book is grounded in scripture, the author commented in the Newnan Times Herald that he "didn't just write it for Christians." Faye Daysen of The Pilot writes that "Fellows uses scripture, but doesn't hit readers over the head with it."

His second book, He Spoke with Authority: Get, then Give the Advantage of Confidence, explores the connection between confidence, humility and empathy. Fellows wrote the majority of the first edition of the book in 45 days, while working at a Walmart store in the midtown neighborhood of Atlanta. By using characters such as Jay Gatsby in The Great Gatsby, and Jane in Jane Eyre, he argues confidence is important to have in interpersonal relationships and in life. From a historical lens, he uses George Washington and Abraham Lincoln. Lastly, the book explores the role that confidence played in the life of Bill McDermott, former CEO of SAP, who Fellows says has "taught [him] more about life than sales."

The Criminal: The Power of An Apology, examines the Criminal on the Cross found in Luke 23:29-43, who gave an unprovoked apology next to Jesus before he died. Fellows examines the humility and vulnerability displayed in the scene and uses classic novels, popular movies and popular music to make his case. In a review by The Valdosta Daily Times, Dean Poling says, "The Criminal looks at the empowerment behind well-known concepts: It takes a big person to apologize. There is power in humility. Less is more."

Mrs. Dubose's Last Wish: The Art of Embracing Suffering was inspired by a character in To Kill a Mockingbird named Mrs. Dubose, who suffers on purpose to rid herself of a morphine addiction and by the writing David Brooks did in "The Road to Character". Drawing on examples in classic literature, popular music, movies, history and the Bible, Fellows makes the claim that the more suffering one goes through, the more empathy they can build. The book also describes the rags-to-riches story of Bill McDermott. A review in the Laredo Morning Post described the book as "short, meaningful and spiritual". The foreword was written by Nassir Ghaemi.

References 

21st-century American non-fiction writers
Writers from Atlanta
Samford University alumni
American Christian writers
Living people
1989 births